{{DISPLAYTITLE:C19H28O3}}
The molecular formula C19H28O3 may refer to:
 Hydroxy-DHEA
 16-Hydroxydehydroepiandrosterone
 7α-Hydroxy-DHEA
 7β-Hydroxy-DHEA
 15α-Hydroxy-DHEA
 Hydroxytestosterone
 4-Hydroxytestosterone
 11β-Hydroxytestosterone
 11-Ketodihydrotestosterone
 11-Ketoandrosterone
 Methylhydroxynandrolone